Chandpura may refer to:

 Chandpura, Bhopal, a village in Madhya Pradesh, India
 Chandpura, Sikar, a village in Rajasthan, India